A captive power plant, also called autoproducer or embedded generation, is an electricity generation facility used and managed by an industrial or commercial energy user for their own energy consumption. Captive power plants can operate off-grid or they can be connected to the electric grid to exchange excess generation.

Captive power plants are generally used by power-intensive industries where continuity and quality of energy supply are crucial, such as aluminum smelters, steel plants, chemical plants, etc. 
However, the radical cost declines for solar power systems have enabled the opportunity for less energy intensive industries to economically grid defect by coupling solar PV with generators or cogeneration units along with battery systems.

See also
Distributed generation
Prosumer

References

Power stations